OMII-UK is an open-source software organisation for the UK research community.

OMII-UK have a number of roles within the UK research community: helping new users get started with E-research, providing the software that is needed and developing that software if it does not exist. OMII-UK also help to guide the development of E-research by liaising with national and international organisations, e-Research groups, standards' groups, and the researchers themselves.

Funding
OMII-UK is funded by the Engineering and Physical Sciences Research Council (EPSRC) and Jisc.

Project partners
OMII-UK is a collaboration between three bodies:

 the School of Electronics and Computer Science at the University of Southampton
 the Open Grid Services Architecture (OGSA)-DAI project at the National e-Science Centre and EPCC
 the myGrid project at the School of Computer Science at the University of Manchester

Project history
The OMII (Open Middleware Infrastructure Institute) started at the University of Southampton in January 2004. In January 2006, the Southampton group joined forces with the established myGrid and OGSA-DAI projects to form OMII-UK - an integral part of the UK e-Science programme.

See also
 e-Science
 Open Grid Forum (OGF)
 Job Submission Description Language (JSDL)
 Business Process Execution Language (BPEL)

External links
OMII-UK

Engineering and Physical Sciences Research Council
Grid computing
Information technology management
Jisc
Middleware